The Shadow Ministry of Alexander Downer was a shadow ministry led by the Opposition Leader and leader of the Liberal Party of Australia, Alexander Downer, in the Parliament of Australia between 23 May 1994 and 30 January 1995. While serving no formal status—only the Leader and Deputy Leader received remuneration for their role over and above that of a Member of Parliament—it was intended to improve the effectiveness of the Opposition by providing an alternative Ministry to voters, consisting of shadow ministers who could ask role-specific questions in parliament, provide comment to the media and offer alternative policies to the government in their areas of responsibility.

The governing ministry at the time was the Second Keating Ministry.

Shadow Ministry (May 1994 to September 1994)
The list below contains a list of Downer's initial shadow ministry:

Outer Shadow Ministry

Shadow Ministry (September 1994 to January 1995)
After the resignation of Peacock and the sacking of Hewson, Downer reshuffled his ministry as follows.

Outer Shadow Ministry

References

Opposition of Australia
Liberal Party of Australia
Downer